Jason Dasey (born 11 April 1962) is an Australian-born TV and radio broadcaster, journalist, emcee and media executive working for Nine Radio as a radio host and ABC News as a digital journalist. He is best known for being the first Australian sports host on CNN International and BBC World News and the original anchor of ESPN's SportsCenter Asia and SportsCenter India (English edition).

Early career
Jason joined The Sydney Morning Herald, Australia's oldest newspaper, as a cadet journalist in 1980. An exclusive story in 1983 from inside the New York Yacht Club on the night Australia won sailing's America's Cup for the first time helped Jason land a job at Australia's Seven Network in Sydney. In 1986, he joined SBS Australia as a producer and reporter, before moving to London the following year where he would work for BBC, Reuters and Sky News.

BBC and CNN
Jason's biggest break came at the end of 1994. As a freelance producer and occasional presenter for BBC World Service Television in London, he was promoted to senior sports anchor on the re-branded BBC World News after a fill-in stint as host. It made him the first Australian newsreader on the global network.
After three years in London with the BBC, Jason moved to the U.S. in 1997. After working as a contract reporter for BBC World Service and Denver local station, KUSA-TV 9-News (NBC), Jason became the first Australian sports anchor on CNN International's World Sport in 1999.

Move to Asia
In November 2001, Jason left CNN to become the senior news presenter at Asian network ESPN Star Sports, based in Singapore. Jason was the original anchor when SportsCenter Asia was launched in 2002 and when SportsCenter India was reshaped as an English-language show in 2003. With Jason as co-host, SportsCenter Asia was voted Best Sports Programme at the 2003 Asian Television Awards. Jason also presented major sports events, including Grand Slam tennis, international cricket and the 2006 FIFA World Cup, for ESPN STAR Sports.
After helping launch two more editions of SportsCenter at ESPN's U.S. headquarters in 2007 and 2008, Jason joined Asian satellite network ASTRO in 2009 as vice-president, executive producer and presenter, based in Kuala Lumpur. He was the main host for seven major tournaments, including the 2010 FIFA World Cup, UEFA Euro 2012, 2014 FIFA World Cup while developing original programming.
In 2014, Jason returned to Singapore to re-join ESPN through The Walt Disney Company as coordinating producer and senior editor, overseeing the launch of the Southeast Asian edition of the football website, ESPN FC. He served as a host for ESPN's Indian audience, hosting four editions of the Australian Open, and cricket's IPL. He also emceed five editions of Asian football's AFC Annual Awards, most recently in December 2019.

Radio Hosting
Having left ESPN in early 2018, Jason became the presenter of the interview-based Weekend Mornings show for newly launched Singapore radio station Money FM 89.3, while continuing to travel to India to work as a TV sports host. After returning to Australia in late 2019, Jason provided Australian segments to Money FM, including news reviews and travel vignettes. In December 2021, Jason began working as a casual host for 4BC on Nine Radio, including the Spencer Howson Weekends show and special coverage of the 2022 Queensland floods. He is also host of Thursday Mornings for 101FM at Logan, south of Brisbane, including a weekly legends' segment featuring classic pop artists. Jason has appeared as a radio guest on ABC Overnights in addition to a role as a digital journalist with ABC_News_(Australia). In June 2022, Jason was named as one of 121 prominent Australians sanctioned by Russia, due to his reporting for ABC_News_(Australia) on the invasion of Ukraine. He is also part of the TV presentation team for the APAC network, which was launched in August 2022, with a weekly show on Special_Broadcasting_Service. In December 2022, Jason hosted two weeks of 4BC Summer Drive, filling in for regular host Neil Breen.

Broadcast Roles
 Newsday, BBC World (Sports presenter, 1995–1997)
 World Sport, CNN (Co-host, 1999–2001)
 Sportsline, ESPN STAR Sports (Host, 2001–2003)
 SportsCenter Asia, ESPN STAR Sports (Original host, 2002–2006)
 SportsCenter India, ESPN STAR Sports (Original host, English edition, 2003–2005)
 SportsCenter Pacific Rim, ESPN International (Original co-host/reporter, 2007–2009)
 SportsCenter Atlantic, ESPN International (Original co-host/reporter, 2007–2009)
 Family Foreman, Episode 6, TV Land (As ESPN Reporter, 20 August 2008)
 FourFourTwo TV Show, ASTRO SuperSport (Original host, 2009–2013)
 Golfing Greats: In Their Own Words, Golf Channel (Original host, 2009–2014)
 2010 FIFA World Cup. ASTRO (Host, June–July 2010)
 Barclays Premier League. ASTRO (Host, August 2010-May 2014)
 Bola@Mamak, ASTRO (Executive Producer, August 2010-May 2013)
 Football Overload, ASTRO (Executive Producer, February 2011-May 2014)
 Stadium Unplugged, ASTRO (Executive Producer, November 2011-May 2014 )
 2011 Rugby World Cup, ASTRO (Host, October 2011)
 UEFA Euro 2012, ASTRO (Host/Executive Producer, June–July 2012)
 BPL Turning Points, ASTRO (Host/Executive Producer, August 2013-May 2014 )
 2014 FIFA World Cup, ASTRO (Host, June–July 2014)
 2015 AFC Asian Cup, ESPN FC TV show (Reporter, January 2015)
 2017 Australian Open, Sony ESPN (Host, January 2017)
 2017 UEFA Champions League Final, ESPN FC Facebook page, (Host, June 2017)
 2018 Australian Open, Sony ESPN (Host, January 2018)
 Money FM 89.3 (Host/Correspondent, March 2018 – Present)
 2018 Indian Premier League, ESPNCricinfo, (Host, May 2018)
 2018 FIFA World Cup, Sony ESPN, (Host, June/July 2018)
 Indian cricket team in Australia in 2018–19, ESPNCricinfo, (Host, January 2019)
 2019 Australian Open, Sony ESPN (Host, January 2019)
 2019 Indian Premier League, ESPNCricinfo, (Host, April 2019)
 Money FM 89.3 (Host, The Breakfast Huddle & Workday Afternoon, January 2020)
 2020 Australian Open, Sony ESPN (Host, January 2020)
 ABC News (Australia), (Reporter/producer, February 2020 – Present)
 Property Line, PropertyTV (Host, April 2020-October 2020)
 101FM, (Host, April 2021 – Present)
 4BC, (Casual Host, December 2021 – Present)
 APAC Network, (Host, May 2022 – Present)

References

External links
Official Jason Dasey website (requires Flash player)
Jason Dasey's Fairfax Media archive 
Jason Dasey ESPN Cricinfo archive 
July 2008 interview for Indian newspaper 
Jason interviews Roger Federer at 2008 U.S. Open 
Jason interviews Hollywood actor Anthony LaPaglia 
CNN Profile 
Jason leaves SportsCenter India – article 
India promos 
Eight years with ESPN 
Jason Dasey, Executive Producer at Astro, interview 
November 2010 radio interview on Malaysia's BFM 
Football Fever Podcast 
Rejoins ESPN 
2015 Asian Cup 
2018 AFC World Cup qualifying draw 
Hosting 2016 Malaysian Charity Shield 
Hosting Property Line on Property TV in 2020 
2021 ABC News article archive 
2021 4BC Weekends host 
Jason Dasey among 121 Australians sanctioned by Russia 
4BC Summer Drive, December 23 2022 podcast on Nine Radio 

List of former BBC newsreaders and journalists

 
Living people
1962 births
Journalists from Sydney
Australian television journalists
Sports journalists
Rugby union commentators
CNN people
People educated at North Sydney Boys High School